Repeat When Necessary is the fifth album by Welsh rock musician Dave Edmunds.

Recording and release

Produced by Edmunds, it was released in 1979 by Swan Song Records (see 1979 in music). It was recorded and released at the same time as Nick Lowe's Labour of Lust, and features the same lineup of musicians: Edmunds, Lowe, Billy Bremner and Terry Williams, collectively known as Rockpile.

Content

"Girls Talk", written by Elvis Costello, Graham Parker's "Crawling from the Wreckage" and the Hank DeVito-penned "Queen of Hearts" are among the highlights of this album. Juice Newton would cover "Queen of Hearts" in an arrangement virtually identical to Edmunds' on Juice, her 1981 breakthrough album.

Among the more obscure covers on the album are "Dynamite" (originally recorded by Cliff Richard and The Shadows) and "Take Me for a Little While" (originally recorded by Evie Sands and later covered by Jackie Ross, Dusty Springfield and Vanilla Fudge). "Home in My Hand" had been recorded seven years previously by Nick Lowe's old band, Brinsley Schwarz. "Bad Is Bad", written by Huey Lewis, would later be recorded by Lewis and his band the News for their 1983 multi-platinum album Sports.

Track listing

Side one
 "Girls Talk" (Elvis Costello) – 3:25
 "Crawling from the Wreckage" (Graham Parker) – 2:53
 "The Creature from the Black Lagoon" (Billy Bremner) – 3:52
 "Sweet Little Lisa" (Donivan Cowart, Martin Cowart, Hank DeVito) – 3:38
 "Dynamite" (Ian Samwell) – 2:33

Side two
 "Queen of Hearts" (Hank DeVito) – 3:17
 "Home in My Hand" (Ronnie Self) – 3:20
 "Goodbye Mr. Good Guy" (Pat Meager, Bremner) – 2:40
 "Take Me for a Little While" (Trade Martin) – 2:39
 "We Were Both Wrong" (Bremner) – 2:42
 "Bad Is Bad" (Alex Call, John Ciambotti, Sean Hopper, Huey Lewis, John McFee, Michael Schriener) – 3:11

Personnel
Dave Edmunds – guitars, piano and vocals
Billy Bremner – guitar and backing vocals
Nick Lowe – bass and backing vocals
Terry Williams – drums

Additional personnel
Huey Lewis – harmonica on "Bad Is Bad"
Albert Lee – guitar on "Sweet Little Lisa"
Roger Bechirian – piano on "Girls Talk"

Charts

Certifications

References

Dave Edmunds albums
Swan Song Records albums
1979 albums
Albums produced by Dave Edmunds